Quadrado is Portuguese for "square". It may refer to:
Samba de Gafieira#Quadrado a dance step
José María Quadrado (1819-1896), Spanish historian and writer
Quadrado, the name of the town square in some places, such as Trancoso, Bahia

See also
 Cuadrado, a surname